River Island is one of the Falkland Islands. It is located in Byron Sound to the south of East Island and Pebble Island. There is a tidal island to its west, separated by a shallow lagoon.

Despite its name, River Island is actually a salt water island.

References

Islands of the Falkland Islands